SM U-76 was a Type UE 1 submarine and one of the 329 submarines serving in the Imperial German Navy in World War I.
U-76 was engaged in the naval warfare and took part in the First Battle of the Atlantic.

Design
German Type UE I submarines were preceded by the longer Type U 66 submarines. U-76 had a displacement of  when at the surface and  while submerged. The submarine was powered by two  engines for use while surfaced, and two  engines for use while submerged. She had two propeller shafts.

U-76 was fitted with two  torpedo tubes (one at the port bow and one starboard stern), four torpedoes, and one  SK L/30 deck gun. She had a complement of thirty-two (twenty-eight crew members and four officers).

Summary of raiding history

References

Notes

Citations

Bibliography

World War I submarines of Germany
1916 ships
U-boats commissioned in 1916
Ships built in Hamburg
Maritime incidents in 1917
U-boats sunk in 1917
World War I shipwrecks in the Atlantic Ocean
German Type UE I submarines